Ardbraccan Crossing was an accommodation crossing near Ardbraccan in County Meath, Ireland. It was located at MP20, 3 miles west of Navan on the Oldcastle branch.

History
It was used by the Great Northern Railway of Ireland as a halt between 1937 and 1942.

References 

Disused railway stations in County Meath
Railway stations opened in 1937
Railway stations closed in 1942